Suspicions is a Canadian thriller film, directed by Patrick Demers and released in 2010. The film stars Maxime Denommée and Sophie Cadieux as Thomas and Marianne, an unhappy couple who are spending time at a cottage in the country to sort out their relationship issues, whose plans are complicated by the intrusions of neighbour Jean (Benoît Gouin). The film, an expansion of his earlier short film Discharge (Décharge), was largely unscripted, with the actors allowed to improvise much of their own dialogue.

The film premiered on July 9, 2010 at the Karlovy Vary Film Festival. and had its Canadian premiere at the 2010 Toronto International Film Festival.

The film received two Genie Award nominations, for Best Editing (Demers) and Best Original Score (Ramachandra Borcar), at the 32nd Genie Awards in 2012. The original short film Discharge, which starred Pierre Brassard, Pierre Gendron and Sonia Vigneault, was the winner of the award for Best Canadian Short Film at the 1999 Toronto International Film Festival.

References

External links 
 

2010 films
2010 thriller films
Canadian thriller films
Quebec films
French-language Canadian films
2010s Canadian films